Trail Dust is a 1936 American Western film directed by Nate Watt, written by Al Martin, and starring William Boyd, James Ellison, George "Gabby" Hayes, Morris Ankrum, Gwynne Shipman, Britt Wood and Dick Dickson. It was released on December 11, 1936, by Paramount Pictures.

Plot

Cast  
 William Boyd as Hopalong Cassidy
 James Ellison as Johnny Nelson 
 George "Gabby" Hayes as Windy Halliday 
 Morris Ankrum as Tex Anderson
 Gwynne Shipman as Beth Clark
 Britt Wood as Lanky
 Dick Dickson as Waggoner
 Earl Askam as Red
 Al Bridge as Babson
 John Beach as Hank
 Ted Adams as Joe Wilson
 T.J. Halligan as Skinny 
 Dan Wolheim as Henchman Borden 
 Harold Daniels as Lewis
 Emmett Daly as George 
 Al St. John as Henchman Al
 Kenneth Harlan as Bowman
 George Chesebro as Saunders
 Leo J. McMahon as Cowhand Bob 
 John Elliott as John Clark

Production

The railroad scenes were filmed on the Sierra Railroad in Tuolumne County, California.

References

External links 
 
 
 
 

1936 films
American Western (genre) films
1936 Western (genre) films
Paramount Pictures films
Films directed by Nate Watt
Hopalong Cassidy films
American black-and-white films
1930s English-language films
1930s American films